Dieudonné Nzapalainga, CSSp (born 14 March 1967) is a Central African Catholic cardinal, the Archbishop of Bangui and a member of the Congregation of the Holy Spirit. 

Nzapalainga served as the apostolic administrator of the Archdiocese of Bangui from 2009 until mid-2012 when Pope Benedict XVI appointed him as its metropolitan archbishop; since 2013 he has served as the President of the Central African Episcopal Conference.

When Pope Francis made Nzapalainga a cardinal on 19 November 2016 he became the youngest cardinal at the time and the first born after the Second Vatican Council.

Life
Dieudonné Nzapalainga was born in Bangassou on 14 March 1967.

After completing his secondary schooling he commenced his period of formation with the Spiritans and began his time as a postulant at Otéle in Cameroon. Nzapalainga underwent his philosophical studies at Libreville in Gabon and his novitiate with the order in Mbalmayo in Cameroon while later undergoing theological studies in France. He professed his initial vows into the order on 8 September 1993 and made his perpetual profession on 6 September 1997; he was ordained to the diaconate the following day. He was ordained to the priesthood on 9 August 1998 in Bangassou.

The new priest began his pastoral mission in Marseille in France and worked as a chaplain at the Saint Francis de Sales house there while also ministering at the parish of Saint Jerome. In total he served in France from 1998 until 2005 when he returned to the Central African Republic. In March 2006 he was appointed the superior for his region of the order and remained in the post until 2008.

Nzapalainga became the apostolic administrator of the Archdiocese of Bangui following the resignation of Paulin Pomodimo and remained as such until mid-2012. Pope Benedict XVI – on 14 May 2012 – appointed him the Archbishop of Bangui and he later received his episcopal consecration on 22 July 2012 from Cardinal Fernando Filoni before being installed in his new archdiocese on 29 July 2012.

Nzapalainga was elevated to the rank of cardinal priest at a consistory held on 19 November 2016. He was assigned the titular church of Sant'Andrea della Valle. He remained the youngest member of the College of Cardinals until the appointment of Paulo Cezar Costa in 2022. He assumed possession of his titular church on 18 December 2016.

References

External links

 

Catholic Hierarchy
Crux Profile

1967 births
21st-century Roman Catholic archbishops in Africa
Central African Republic Roman Catholic archbishops
Living people
Cardinals created by Pope Francis
People from Bangassou
Recipients of the Four Freedoms Award
Central African Republic cardinals
Holy Ghost Fathers
Roman Catholic archbishops of Bangui